The drab moray (Gymnothorax monochrous) is a moray eel found in coral reefs in the Pacific and Indian Oceans. It was first named by Pieter Bleeker in 1856, and is also commonly known as the brown moray, monochrome moray, monotone moray, or plain moray eel.

References

External links
 Fishes of Australia : Gymnothorax monochrous

drab moray
Marine fish of Northern Australia
Taxa named by Pieter Bleeker
drab moray